Kurt Longrich is a retired West German slalom canoeist who competed from the late 1950s to the mid-1960s. He won a silver medal in the C-2 team event at the 1963 ICF Canoe Slalom World Championships in Spittal.

References

External links 
 Kurt LONGRICH at CanoeSlalom.net

German male canoeists
Possibly living people
Year of birth missing (living people)
Medalists at the ICF Canoe Slalom World Championships